Ashlee + Evan (stylized in all caps) are an American musical duo consisting of married musicians Ashlee Simpson and Evan Ross. They released their debut single, "I Do", on September 7, 2018, two days before the premiere of their reality television series of the same name. Their eponymous debut extended play Ashlee + Evan (EP) was then released on October 12, 2018, through Access Records, and was supported by a tour in select cities across North America in January 2019.

Discography

Notes

References

2018 establishments in the United States
American musical duos
Ashlee Simpson
Contemporary R&B supergroups
Male–female musical duos
Married couples
Musical groups established in 2018